Anara may refer to:

Places 
 Anara, Nigeria, a town in Imo State, Nigeria
 Anara, Iran, a village in Markazi Province, Iran
 Anara, Kheda, a village in Gujarat, India
 Anara, Purulia, a village in West Bengal, India
 Anara Tower, a proposed tower in Dubai, UAE

People with the name 
 Anara Gupta
 Anara Naeem